Broder Lysholm Krohg (19 August 1777 – 16 October 1861) was a Norwegian military officer and civil servant.

References

1777 births
1861 deaths
Norwegian Army personnel